Nikolaos (Nikos) Chatzivrettas (alternate spelling: Hatzivrettas) (Greek: Νικόλαος (Νίκος) Χατζηβρέττας; born May 26, 1977) is a retired Greek professional basketball player. At a height of Chatzivrettas 1.97 m (6 ft 5  in) tall, he played at the shooting guard and small forward positions. He was inducted into the Greek Basket League Hall of Fame in 2022.

Professional career
Before signing with Aris, Chatzivrettas played with Aias Evosmou, Iraklis, CSKA Moscow, and Panathinaikos. He won the EuroLeague championship with Panathinaikos in 2007 and 2009. In July 2009, he joined "The Emperor" of Greek basketball, Aris Thessaloniki.

He left Aris at the end of 2011, after his contract ended, and he eventually retired from playing professional club basketball after that.

National team career
Chatzivrettas was a member of the senior Greece men's national basketball team. He played with Greece at the 2001 EuroBasket, the 2003 EuroBasket, and the 2004 Summer Olympic Games. With Greece, he won the gold medal at the 2005 EuroBasket, and the silver medal at the 2006 FIBA World Cup. He also played at the 2007 EuroBasket.

Awards and accomplishments

Pro career
3× Greek League All-Star: (2001, 2002, 2004)
Greek League Top Scorer: (2002)
Russian Championship Champion: (2003)
6× Greek League Champion: (2004, 2005, 2006, 2007, 2008, 2009)
 Greek League Finals MVP: (2004)
5× Greek Cup Winner: (2005, 2006, 2007, 2008, 2009)
2× EuroLeague Champion: (2007, 2009)
2× Triple Crown Winner: (2007, 2009)
 Greek Basket League Hall of Fame: (2022)

Greece national team
6× Acropolis Tournament Champion: (2000, 2002, 2003, 2005, 2006, 2007)
2× Acropolis Tournament MVP: (2003, 2004)
2005 EuroBasket: 
2006 FIBA Stanković World Cup: 
2006 FIBA World Cup:

Career statistics

EuroLeague

|-
| style="text-align:left;"| 2002–03
| style="text-align:left;"| CSKA
| 22 || 19 || 27.0 || .558 || .376 || .842 || 2.6 || 1.8 || 1.0 || .1 || 12.0 || 11.7
|-
| style="text-align:left;"| 2003–04
| style="text-align:left;" rowspan=6| Panathinaikos
| 20 || 12 || 30.1 || .545 || .342 || .784 || 2.9 || 1.3 || .6 || .1 || 12.1 || 10.5
|-
| style="text-align:left;"| 2004–05
| 21 || 11 || 18.5 || .558 || .381 || .750 || 1.3 || 0.9 || .4 || .1 || 6.6 || 4.7
|-
| style="text-align:left;"| 2005–06
| 23 || 22 || 17.2 || .614 || .429 || .810 || 1.1 || 0.6 || .3 || .0 || 6.5 || 4.4
|-
| style="text-align:left;background:#AFE6BA;"| 2006–07†
| 22 || 10 || 23.1 || .530 || .429 || .695 || 1.6 || 1.0 || .9 || .1 || 7.9 || 6.5
|-
| style="text-align:left;"| 2007–08
| 18 || 6 || 16.2 || .667 || .519 || .722 || 1.2 || 0.6 || .4 || .2 || 4.8 || 4.3
|-
| style="text-align:left;background:#AFE6BA;"| 2008–09†
| 15 || 4 || 8.2 || .333 || .353 || .833 || .6 || .3 || .2 || .0 || 1.9 || .1
|- class="sortbottom"
| align="center" colspan="2"| Career
| 141 || 84 || ? || .560 || .393 || .776 || 1.7 || .9 || .6 || .1 || 7.7 || ?

References

External links
Euroleague.net Profile
FIBA Archive Profile
Eurobasket.com Profile
Greek Basket League Profile 
Hellenic Basketball Federation Profile 
Nikos Chatzivrettas Video Tribute
Chatziverttas Dunk

1977 births
Living people
2006 FIBA World Championship players
Aris B.C. players
Basketball players from Thessaloniki
FIBA EuroBasket-winning players
Greek men's basketball players
Greek Basket League players
Greek Macedonians
Iraklis Thessaloniki B.C. players
Panathinaikos B.C. players
PBC CSKA Moscow players
Shooting guards
Small forwards